Japan participated in the 2006 Asian Games held in Doha, Qatar from December 1, 2006 to December 15, 2006.

Participation details

List of medalists
This country garnered a total of 198 medals of which 50 are gold.

Gold medalists
 Shingo Suetsugu – Athletics (Men's 200m)
 Daichi Sawano – Athletics (Men's Pole Vault)
 Kenji Narisako – Athletics (Men's 400 m Hurdles)
 Kumiko Ikeda – Athletics (Women's Long Jump)
 Kayoko Fukushi – Athletics (Women's 10,000m)
 Masaru Ito – Bowling (Men's Five Player Teams)
 Yoshinao Masatoki
 Tomoyuki Sasaki
 Toshihiko Takahashi
 Masaaki Takemoto
 Tomokatsu Yamashita
 Mayuko Hagiwara – Cycling (Women's Road Race)
 Ryuji Umeda – Cue Sports (Men's Carom Cushion 3 Singles)
 Satoshi Kawabata – Cue sports (Men's 8-Ball Pool Singles)
 Tsubasa Kitatsuru – Cycling (Men's Sprint)
 Kazuya Narita – Cycling (Men's Team Sprint)
 Yudai Nitta
 Kazunari Watanabe
 Yoshiaki Oiwa – Equestrian (Eventing-Individual)
 Yuki Ota – Fencing (Men's Individual Foil)
 Hiroyuki Tomita – Artistic Gymnastics (Men's Pommel Horse)
 Hisashi Mizutori – Gymnastics (Men's Horizontal Bar)
 Tatsuaki Egusa Judo (Men's – 60 kg)
 Yasuyuki Muneta Judo (Men's +100 kg)
 Masae Ueno Judo (Women's – 70 kg)
 Sae Nakazawa – Judo (Women's – 78 kg)
 Tetsuya Furukawa – Karate (Men's Individual Kata)
 Tomoko Araga – Karate (Women's Individual Kumite – 53 kg)
 Yuka Sato – Karate (Women's Individual Kumite – 60 kg)
 Nao Morooka – Karate (Women's Individual Kata)
 Yuya Higashiyama – Rowing (Men's Four)
 Yu Kataoka
 Rokuroh Okumura
 Yoshinori Sato
 Hideki Omoto – Rowing (Men's Double Sculls)
 Takahiro Suda
 Masahiro Tsuiki – Rugby (Men's 7 a side)
 Eiji Yamamoto
 Yusuke Kobuki
 Akihito Yamada
 Takashi Sato
 Takeshi Fujiwara
 Yohei Shinomiya
 Takashi Suzuki
 Yuki Okuzono
 Hiroki Yamazaki
 Hiroki Yoshida
 Yusaku Kuwazuru
 Ai Kondo – Sailing (470 Women)
 Naoko Kamata
 Yukiko Ueno – Softball (Women)
 Yuko Endo
 Mariko Masubuchi
 Yuka Suzuki
 Emi Naito
 Aki Uenishi
 Eri Yamada
 Satoko Mabuchi
 Ayumi Karino
 Masumi Mishina
 Megu Hirose
 Rei Nishiyama
 Sachiko Ito
 Emi Inui
 Mariko Goto
 Shigeo Nakahori
 Hidenori Shinohara – Soft Tennis (Men's Team)
 Naoya Hanada
 Tatsuro Kawamura
 Tsuneo Takagawa

References

Nations at the 2006 Asian Games
2006
Asian Games